Gustaf Adolf Lindström (6 November 1882 – 15 November 1928),  better known under his pen name Kössi Kaatra, was a Finnish working-class poet, journalist and theatre director.

Biography 
He was born into a poor working-class family. He became an orphan. As a child, he earned his living by working as a street vendor of newspapers.

In 1899 Kaatra became a lawyer for a law firm. From that period he began to take part in the labor movement. In 1902, Kaatra debuted as a poet and wrote in the style of Neo-romanticism.

From 1903 to 1910 he was a journalist and director of the Workers' Theater in Tampere. On November 14, 1905 (November 1 O.S.), he was a leading member of the general strike and it the balcony of Tampere City Hall, he read out the "Red Declaration" (Manifesto of the Finnish People) demanding civil liberties, democracy and labor rights. After the strike, Kaatra started to focus on directing and worked as theatre director in the Tampere Workers' Theatre.

After the February Revolution, Kaatra began to write essays and poetry once. During the Finnish Civil War, his dacha in Oulu was taken over by the White forces. He managed to survive the White Terror by hiding in the attic of his dacha.

Kaatra managed to escape to Sweden where he settled and continued his literary activities until his death in 1928.

Selected works 

 Kynnyksellä, poetry. 1903
 Elämästä, poetry. 1904
 Runoja. 1905
 Kyttä, poetry. 1906
 Kahleet pois! 1906
 Murroksessa, poetry. 1906
 Suurlakkokuvia. 1906
 Punaiset ja valkoiset, novel. 1919
 Suuririkos. 1921
 Alhaisolauluja, poetry. 1922
 Ihmisen kauneuteen! 1923.
 Äiti ja poika, 1924
 Soi vapun virsi, poetry. 1926
 Sä syty vapahduksen haltioon! poetry. 1926
 Alhaisolauluja: selected 1903-1927. 1978.

References

1882 births
1928 deaths
20th-century Finnish poets
20th-century Finnish novelists
20th-century Finnish journalists
Finnish theatre directors
Finnish socialists
Social Democratic Party of Finland politicians
Finnish emigrants to Sweden